Two regiments of West Riding Yeomanry Cavalry were formed in 1794, disbanded at the Peace of Amiens in 1802, and reformed in 1802 and 1803.

The 1st or Southern Regiment of West Riding Yeomanry was reformed in 1803 and became the Yorkshire Dragoons in 1889.
The 2nd or Northern Regiment of West Riding Yeomanry was reformed in 1802 and became the Yorkshire Hussars in 1819.